Lorenzo patient record systems are  a type of Electronic health record provided by DXC Technology, originally as part of the United Kingdom government’s National Programme for IT (NHS Connecting for Health) in the NHS.

There is a long history of negotiations between the NHS and the company.

On 4 September 2012, the UK Department of Health announced that whilst it was "dismantling" the National Programme for IT, Lorenzo would be supplied under a new legally binding agreement with DXC.

University Hospitals of Morecambe Bay NHS Foundation Trust was the first to deploy the technology. It implemented electronic patient record system Lorenzo Release 1.9 in June 2010. Humber NHS Foundation Trust was the first mental health organisation to use the DXC Lorenzo patient record systems in June 2012. Lorenzo systems were introduced to Warrington & Halton Hospitals NHS Foundation Trust during 2015. In June 2015 Hull and East Yorkshire Hospitals NHS Trust and Norfolk and Suffolk NHS Foundation Trust went live with Lorenzo. In July 2015, Digital Health Intelligence reported DXC as stating that 19 NHS Trusts had contracted to take the Lorenzo system.

George Eliot Hospital NHS Trust, Ipswich Hospital NHS Trust, Tameside Hospital NHS Foundation Trust and Hull and East Yorkshire Hospitals NHS Trust  are also implementing Lorenzo under a financial support package which has been described as controversial.

Deployments of Lorenzo have not been without reported teething troubles. Delays in the provision of data to NHS England's waiting list system were linked to Lorenzo implementations in an HSJ article in May 2014.

North Bristol NHS Trust went live with Lorenzo in November 2015, replacing a Cerner system. North Bristol was the first NHS trust in the South of England to take the system as part of an open procurement exercise outside of DXC's central relationship with the NHS.

Mid Essex Hospital Services NHS Trust installed a Lorenzo system in May 2017.
	
In 2018 the company was given about £10 million for a national “digital exemplar” programme for the National Programme for IT. Royal Papworth Hospital NHS Foundation Trust, Hull and East Yorkshire Hospitals NHS Trust, North Staffordshire Combined Healthcare NHS Trust and Warrington and Halton Hospitals NHS Foundation Trust are to be the examplars maximising the potential benefits of using electronic patient records.

Barnsley Hospital NHS Foundation Trust switched its electronic patient record from the Lorenzo system to System C’s Careflow in July 2020.  Walsall Healthcare NHS Trust will do the same shortly.  Others of the 20 trusts which installed Lorenzo systems as part of the National Programme for IT are in the process of launching procurements for new systems.

Sheffield Teaching Hospitals uses Lorenzo, and it has sometimes been problematic.

References

Electronic health records
National Health Service (England)